August Mencken Sr. (1854–1899) was an American cigar magnate who founded Aug. Mencken & Bro. in 1873 with a starting capital of $23 of his own money and $21 of his brother's. A member of Baltimore's German-American community, Mencken was a high-tariff Republican who ran a nonunion factory, viewed the eight-hour day as a foreign innovation destined to destroy America, and drank rye whiskey before every meal, including breakfast.

In about 1889, the Baltimore local Cigar Makers' International Union called a strike. The union did not have the funds to pay full benefits to members; the best it could manage was the $2.10 cost of a ticket to Philadelphia, which had so many cigar shops it was known as the Cigarmaker's Heaven. The only proof that it required of a candidate's profession were the tools of the trade: a boxwood cutting-board and cutting tools. The anti-union Mencken acquired a large quantity of the tools, rounded up a large number of drunks and tramps, gave them a shot of whiskey and a set of the tools, and sent them to Union headquarters for their tickets. In the course of a few weeks, according to Mencken himself, "at least a thousand poor bums were run through the mill." The union went broke and was effectively destroyed, and the strike was broken.

In 1879, August married the German-American Anna Margaret Abhau (1858 – 1925). Their first child, Henry Louis "H. L." Mencken, was born there in Baltimore in 1880 and their second, August Mencken Jr., was born in 1889.

See also
 History of the Germans in Baltimore, Maryland

References
 Henry Louis Mencken, The days of H. L. Mencken: Happy days, Newspaper days, Heathen days. New York: Alfred A. Knopf (1947)

1854 births
1899 deaths
American agnostics
American manufacturing businesspeople
American people of German descent
Businesspeople in the tobacco industry
Maryland Republicans
Businesspeople from Baltimore
19th-century American businesspeople